Montaña de Comayagua National Park is a national park in Honduras. It was established on 1 January 1987 and covers an area of 184.8 square kilometres. The park is known locally by the name Parque Nacional Montaña de Comayagua and the acronym PANACOMA.

The park can be reached by heading north from Comayagua on the highway to La Libertad.  At the town of San Jeróniomo turn right onto a dirt road.  The turn off is marked by a sign.  Follow the signs for Río Negro and PANACOMA. The road is mostly single lane with a few concrete bridges.  A four-wheel-drive vehicle with good clearance is necessary to successfully transit the road.  There is a park information centre in the Village of Río Negro at  14°32'33.12"N  87°33'14.82"W.  Hiking guides can be hired at the information centre.

The park is home of many waterfalls.  The Río Gavilán has a  waterfall called the Cascada de los Ensueños that is located at  14°32'57.65"N  87°32'36.17"W on a well constructed trail about an hour-long hike from the trailhead.  The trailhead is located at  14°33'1.82"N  87°33'1.71"W along the road leading to Río Negro.

External links
 PANACOMA (Spanish)

References

National parks of Honduras
Protected areas established in 1987
Central American pine–oak forests
Central American dry forests